Mel Ponder is an American politician. Affiliated with the Republican Party, Ponder served as a member of the Florida House of Representatives, representing the 4th district between 2016 and 2020.

Ponder previously served as the mayor of Destin, Florida from 2014 to 2016. On August 30, 2016, Ponder won a close and contentious five-way primary to become the Republican nominee to represent District 4 in the Florida House of Representatives. Ponder was elected unopposed in the November general election. He succeeded state representative Matt Gaetz, who was elected to the Florida 1st District U.S. House seat.

References

External links
 

21st-century American politicians
Florida Republicans
Living people
Mayors of places in Florida
People from Destin, Florida
Florida State University alumni
1968 births